The Opel 5/12 PS, also known as the Puppchen (German for Doll), is a small car from the German automaker Opel. It was built from 1911 to 1920 in four series. It was available as an open two seater, a Landaulet or as a limousine.

5/12 PS (1911) 
The first built series had a 1.2 liter engine with 12 PS at 1800 rpm. The top speed was 50–55 km/h. The car cost between 4,000 and 5,200 Mark.

5/12 PS (1912-1914) 
The second series had a larger and more powerful engine. The engine capacity was 1.3 liters. It made 14,5 PS at 1800 rpm. The car cost between 4,200 and 5,200 Mark.

5/12 (5/14) PS (1914) 
The same power capacity was increased to 1.4 liters. It was available as an open top four seater. This model variant was nicknamed "little doll" and cost 7,300 Mark.

5/12 (5/14) PS (1916-1920) 
From 1916, the car received a 1.5 liter engine with 14.5 PS at 1800 rpm. It cost as a two- and four seater 5,300 Mark.

5 12 PS
Cars introduced in 1911
1920s cars